Dyaul Island (also Djaul) is an island in New Ireland Province, Papua New Guinea. Its area is 100 km2.  The inhabitants live mainly in seven villages, and frequently visit Kavieng, the capital of the province, for supplies or to sell produce and fish.  There are two languages, not counting Tok Pisin, spoken on Dyaul; Tigak and Tiang. Tigak is widely spoken on the western end of the island in two villages.  Tiang is spoken across the remainder of the island.

References 

Islands of Papua New Guinea
New Ireland Province